Amor Ben Yahia (born 1 July 1985 in Kebili) is a Tunisian athlete specialising in the 3000 metres steeplechase. He represented his country at the 2012 Summer Olympics as well as two World Championships.

His personal best in the event is 8:14.05 set in Mersin in 2013. This is the current national record.

Competition record

1Disqualified in the final

References

1985 births
Living people
People from Kebili Governorate
Tunisian male long-distance runners
Tunisian male steeplechase runners
Olympic athletes of Tunisia
Athletes (track and field) at the 2012 Summer Olympics
Athletes (track and field) at the 2016 Summer Olympics
World Athletics Championships athletes for Tunisia
Mediterranean Games gold medalists for Tunisia
Athletes (track and field) at the 2013 Mediterranean Games
Mediterranean Games medalists in athletics
Athletes (track and field) at the 2019 African Games
African Games competitors for Tunisia
21st-century Tunisian people